Michael J. Rogers (born June 2, 1963) is an American former law enforcement officer and politician who served as the U.S. representative for . A Republican, Rogers served from 2001 to 2015. From 2011 to 2015, he was Chair of the United States House Permanent Select Committee on Intelligence.

Rogers previously was a CNN national security news commentator. He also served as an executive producer for the CNN program Declassified: Untold Stories of American Spies.

Early life, education, and law enforcement career
Rogers was born in Livingston County, Michigan, the son of Joyce A. and John C. Rogers. He graduated from Adrian College in Adrian, Michigan in 1985, from which he earned a bachelor's degree in Criminal Justice and Sociology, and served in the United States Army from 1985 to 1989. He worked as a Special Agent with the Federal Bureau of Investigation in its Chicago office, specializing in organized crime and public corruption, 1989–1994. He is a member of the Society of Former Special Agents of the Federal Bureau of Investigation. In 2017, Mike Rogers was interviewed to be the new director of the Federal Bureau of Investigation, after James Comey was dismissed.

Michigan State Senate

Elections
He was first elected in 1994. In 1998, he won a second term with 68% of the vote.

Tenure
He represented three counties: Clinton, Livingston, and Shiawassee. He served as Majority Leader from 1999 to 2000.

Rogers wrote legislation creating the Michigan Education Savings Plan, which allows Michigan families to set aside tax-free funds for educating their children when they are ready for college or vocational training.

U.S. House of Representatives

Elections

Rogers was elected as a Republican from the 8th District of Michigan to the United States House of Representatives in one of the nation's closest congressional races of 2000. He defeated Democratic State Senator Dianne Byrum by 111 votes to win the District 8 seat left open by Debbie Stabenow.  However, the district was redrawn to be much friendlier to Republicans in the 2002 round of redistricting. It lost its share of heavily Democratic Genesee County while being pushed further east into the solidly Republican northern portion of Oakland County and also gaining Republican-leaning Clinton County, north of Lansing. From 2002 onwards, Rogers was continuously reelected with little difficulty. He usually ran up large margins in the areas of the district outside heavily Democratic Lansing, the district's largest city.

Tenure

Rogers' measure to make education savings plans free of federal taxes was adopted in 2003 (see Economic Growth and Tax Relief Reconciliation Act of 2001). His health savings account program for low-income families who are covered by Medicaid was signed into law on February 8, 2008.

In 2006, he cosponsored H.R. 4411, the Goodlatte-Leach Internet Gambling Prohibition Act and H.R. 4777, the Internet Gambling Prohibition Act. He has also introduced pain care management legislation pertaining to Americans who are restricted by severe, chronic pain.

Rogers was the primary sponsor of the Respect for America's Fallen Heroes Act, H.R. bill 5037, which was signed into law by President George W. Bush on May 29, 2006. This bill is designed to ban protests on federal land from occurring near the funerals of soldiers that were killed in action.

The CBO has said that Rogers's H.R. 1206 to make it easier for states to obtain waivers from some Medical Loss Ratio requirements would add $1.1 billion to the deficit between 2013 and 2022.

On November 30, 2011, Congressman Rogers introduced the Cyber Intelligence Sharing and Protection Act (CISPA). "The bill would allow the government to share all of its classified cyber-security knowledge with private companies, forming knowledge-sharing agreements that would hopefully keep China (and other countries and hackers) out of American computer networks. The catch is that the information shared is a two-lane street—companies would also be allowed to share private data with the federal government, provided there is a reasonable 'cyber threat.'"  "In the current version, most personal information would be stripped from data shared with the government, and the bill no longer defines intellectual property theft as something relating to national security "We think we're making huge progress with the privacy groups, so they understand what we're trying to accomplish, which isn't anything nefarious," Rogers said"

Rogers has reaffirmed his support for the NSA's programs, stating on October 30, 2013, "You can't have your privacy violated if you don't know your privacy is violated."

Rogers introduced and supported the Intelligence Authorization Act for Fiscal Years 2014 and 2015 (H.R. 4681; 113th Congress), a bill that would authorize a variety of intelligence agencies and their appropriations for fiscal years 2014 and 2015. The total spending authorized by the bill is classified, but estimates based on intelligence leaks made by Edward Snowden indicate that the budget could be approximately $50 billion. Rogers said that members of Congress "have somehow decided over the last year that our intelligence services are the problem... they are part of the solution."

In March 2014, Rogers announced he would not seek an 8th term in Congress.  He later launched "Something to Think About", a daily radio segment.  Former Michigan State Senator Mike Bishop won the Republican primary and defeated Democratic challenger Eric Schertzing.

Committee assignments
 Committee on Energy and Commerce
 Subcommittee on Communications and Technology
 Subcommittee on Health
 Permanent Select Committee on Intelligence (Chairman)
 As chair of the full committee, he may serve as an ex officio member of all subcommittees.

Personal life
Rogers is the youngest of five sons. His father was a public school teacher-administrator-football coach and his mother was the director of a local Chamber of Commerce. Rogers' older brother Bill was a state representative in Michigan. His wife, Kristi Rogers, previously served as the CEO and as a managing director of Aspen Healthcare Services, and now is a managing partner for Principal to Principal.

Rogers sits on the Atlantic Council's Board of Directors. He is also the David M. Abshire Chair at the Center for the Study of the Presidency & Congress, an Intelligence Project Senior Fellow at Harvard University's Belfer Center, and a member of George Mason University's National Security Institute Board of Advisors.

References

External links

 
 
 

|-

|-

1963 births
20th-century American politicians
21st-century American politicians
Adrian College alumni
Methodists from Michigan
Federal Bureau of Investigation agents
Living people
Republican Party Michigan state senators
People from Howell, Michigan
Republican Party members of the United States House of Representatives from Michigan
United States Army officers